Meyriccia is a genus of snout moths. It is monotypic, with a single species, Meyriccia latro, that is found in Australia.

The wingspan is about 30 mm. Adults have pale fawn forewings with a brown stripe. The hindwings are fawn with a silken sheen and fringed trailing edges.

The larvae feed on Xanthorrhoea species, including Xanthorrhoea semiplana. They live communally in silken webs and bore holes in the seed heads of their host plant. They reach a length of about 20 mm.

References

Moths described in 1873
Tirathabini
Monotypic moth genera
Moths of Australia
Pyralidae genera